"Gold" was the third single released from Beverley Knight's studio album, Who I Am. The song, which peaked at #27 in Britain, was different from the album version - which was produced by Mike Spencer, and is a big favourite amongst fans. The accompanying video was directed by Adrian Moat.

Knight promoted the song by performing the song on Top of the Pops and sister show Top of the Pops Saturday.

Background

During Knight's 100% Tour in 2010, she announced that she wrote "Gold" after a friend of Knight's told her that she thought we was 'gold'. Knight was then immediately inspired and sat down at a piano and then wrote the song. She dedicated the song to her friend on the album of which "Gold" appears: Who I Am  and also whilst live.

Track list
CD 1
"Gold" (single mix)
"Liquid Gold" (Mark Revel extended mix)
"Gold" (album version)
"Gold" (video)

CD 2
"Gold" (single mix)
"Same (As I Ever Was)" (Bump N Flex mix)
"Same (As I Ever Was)" (album version)

Charts

Personnel
Written by Beverley Knight, Mike Spencer
Single version mixed and produced by Mike 'Spike' Drake
Album version recorded and produced by Mike Spencer
All vocals performed and arranged by Beverley Knight
Drums performed by YoYo, Real drums on album version performed by Shane Meehan
Decks performed by DJ Pogo
Piano Martin Lister
Drums Shane Meehan
Bass Derek Mcyntyre
Guitar Rob Harris

See also
Beverley Knight discography

2002 singles
Beverley Knight songs
Songs written by Beverley Knight
2001 songs